The Changhe Haitun (海豚) is a 5 to 8 seater microvan built and sold in China by the Chinese automaker Changhe.

Overview

Based on the predecessing cab-over „Changhe Junma CH6353“ series, the Changhe Haitun has the front axle moved forward while the body behind the B-pillars remained the same.

The engine for the „Changhe Haitun CH6370C“ is a 1051cc inline-four engine producing 38.5kW and the engine for the „Changhe Haitun CH6370A“ is a 970cc inline-four engine producing 35kW, both mated to a 5 speed manual transmission.

References

Microvans
Changhe vehicles
Cars of China
Cars introduced in 2002